Cheryl Gudinas (born May 11, 1967) is an American retired racquetball player. Gudinas won three [www.internationalracquetball.com International Racquetball Federation] (IRF) World Championships in Women’s Singles (2000, 2002, 2004), and was the #1 player on the women's pro racquetball tour from 2000-2004, finishing in the top 10 on tour a record 21 seasons.

Professional career
Gudinas's professional career is highlighted by her two US Open Racquetball Championships in 2002 and 2004, which helped her attain the #1 position on the women's pro tour. She was a top 5 player on the women's pro tour from 1993-94 to 2010-2011, including four seasons as the #1 player from 2000-2004. Her 20 years ranked in the season ending top 10 is a record for women's pro racquetball. Gudinas fell to the #11 spot this past season partly due to missing the first few tournaments of the season with a foot injury.

International career
Gudinas won three consecutive International Racquetball Federation (IRF)  World Championships in 2000, 2002 and 2004. She defeated Canadians Christie Van Hees and Jennifer Saunders in 2000 and 2002, respectively, and Chilean Angela Grisar in 2004.

Gudinas won the Pan American Championships (formerly the Tournament of the Americas) in 1994 (against American Laura Fenton), 1997 (Michelle Gould, USA), 2001 (Josée Grand'Maître, Canada) and 2009 (Carola Loma, Bolivia). In 2005, Gudinas was the Pan Am Championship silver medalist, losing the final to Kristen Walsh and was also silver in 2003, when she lost to Fenton, in 1999, when she lost to Robin Levine, and 1998, losing to Michelle Gould.

Gudinas has also won two gold medals at the Pan American Games. In 1999 she defeated Canadian Christie Van Hees in the final in Winnipeg, Canada and beat fellow American Laura Fenton in the 2003 final in Santo Domingo, Dominican Republic. In the 2011 Pan Am Games in Guadalajara, Mexico, Gudinas earned the bronze medal, losing to eventual gold medalist Paola Longoria of Mexico in the semi-finals. Gudinas was also a silver medalist in 2011 from the Pan Am Games team competition.

Most recently in the 2012 Worlds, Gudinas was a bronze medalist in singles, losing to Canadian Jennifer Saunders in the semi-finals, and a silver medalist in the team competition, when the American women's team lost to the Mexican team, including a loss by Gudinas to Mexican Jessica Parrilla.

Gudinas has played in the World Games twice, and she finished 4th in both 2009 and 2011.

US championships
Gudinas won 5 consecutive US Nationals Championships in singles from 1999 to 2003, and also won in 2005, 2008 and 2010. Her eight titles are tied for the most all time with Michelle Gould.

Gudinas teamed up with Gould in 1995 and 1996 to win two of her three US National Doubles titles. Her other title was in 2001 with Kim Russell.

Career summary

Gudinas won 3 IRF World Championships in Women’s Singles, 2 US Open Racquetball Championships, and 8 US Racquetball Championships in Women’s Singles. Her 21 seasons in the Ladies Professional Racquetball Tour top 10 is a record.

Career record

This table lists Gudinas’s results in annual events.

Note: The US Open began in 1996. W = winner, F = finalist, SF = semi-finalist, QF = quarterfinalist, 16 = Round of 16, 32 = Round of 32, 64 = Round of 64.

See also
 List of racquetball players

References

External links
 LPRT Page for Cheryl Gudinas

1967 births
Living people
American racquetball players
Racquetball players at the 2011 Pan American Games
Pan American Games gold medalists for the United States
Pan American Games silver medalists for the United States
Pan American Games bronze medalists for the United States
Pan American Games medalists in racquetball
Racquetball players at the 1999 Pan American Games
Competitors at the 2013 World Games
Racquetball players at the 2003 Pan American Games
Medalists at the 1999 Pan American Games
Medalists at the 2003 Pan American Games
Medalists at the 2011 Pan American Games